Tommy Oliver is an American film producer, director, writer, cinematographer, photographer, financier, and entrepreneur. He directed, produced, shot, and edited AFI Film Festival audience award winnerJuice Wrld: Into The Abyss (2021), 40 Years a Prisoner, and 1982, and recently produced four Sundance Film Festival 2023 films including Young. Wild. Free., Fancy Dance, To Live and Die and Live (EP), and the Grand Jury Prize winner, Going to Mars: The Nikki Giovanni Project. He also producedThe Perfect Guy (2015) and Sundance Film Festival and AFI Film Festival audience award winner Kinyarwanda, and co-created and Executive Produced the documentary series Black Love. 

Oliver is also known for his photography including his 70+ photos in the Smithsonian National Museum of African American History and Culture.

Oliver is from Philadelphia, a Carnegie Mellon University alum, Founder and CEO of the production company Confluential Films, and Founder and Chairman of the media company Black Love, Inc. which he founded with his wife, Codie Elaine Oliver.  He is on the Board of the Philadelphia Film Society.

Select filmography
Kinyarwanda (2011; producer)
1982 (2013; writer, director, producer, and editor)
The Perfect Guy (2015; producer)
Halfway (2016; executive producer)
Destined (2016; producer)
Black Love (2017–present; creator and executive producer)
40 Years a Prisoner (2020; director, producer, cinematographer, and editor)
Juice Wrld: Into the Abyss (2021; director, producer, cinematographer, and editor)
Going to Mars: The Nikki Giovanni Project (2023; producer)
Fancy Dance (2023; producer)
To Live and Die and Live (2023; Executive Producer)
Young. Wild. Free. (2023; producer)
The Perfect Find (2023; producer)

References

External links
 

Living people
American film producers
Film producers from Pennsylvania
People from Philadelphia
Year of birth missing (living people)